William Alabaster (also Alablaster, Arblastier) (27 February 1567buried 28 April 1640) was an English poet, playwright, and religious writer.

Alabaster became a Roman Catholic convert in Spain when on a diplomatic mission as chaplain. His religious beliefs led him to be imprisoned several times; eventually he gave up Catholicism, and was favoured by James I. He received a prebend in St Paul's Cathedral, London, and the living of Therfield, Hertfordshire. He died at Little Shelford, Cambridgeshire.

Biography

Alabaster was born at Hadleigh, Suffolk, the son of Roger Alabaster of the cloth merchant family long settled there, and Bridget Winthrop of Groton, Suffolk. 

According to Fr. John Gerard, an underground Roman Catholic priest of the Society of Jesus who briefly served as Alabaster's spiritual director, Alabaster was, "raised in Calvin's bosom," and, "was used to having his own way over other people." 

He was educated at Westminster School, and Trinity College, Cambridge from 1583. He became a fellow of Trinity, and in 1592 was incorporated of the university of Oxford.

In June 1596 Alabaster sailed with Robert Devereux, Earl of Essex, on the expedition to Cadiz in the capacity of Anglican military chaplain, and, while accompanying a subsequent diplomatic mission to Spain, Alabaster converted from Anglicanism to Roman Catholicism. An account of his conversion is given in an obscurely worded sonnet contained in a manuscript copy of Divine Meditations, by Mr Alabaster. Alabaster defended his new Faith in a pamphlet, Seven Motives, of which no copy is extant. 

After his conversion and in about 1597, Alabaster wrote his Latin tragedy of Roxana, which Samuel Johnson later called, "a tragedy against the Church of England.

It appears that Alabaster was imprisoned for his change of faith in the Tower of London and in The Clink in 1597 and 1598. According to historian Robert Caraman, during his incarceration, Alabaster adapted the sonnet form from love poetry into Christian poetry. Alabaster's 85-long sonnet sequence, which "portray some profound spiritual experiences", were mainly, "written in 1597 while he was in The Clink prison and was conscious (as he himself says) of unwonted inspiration."

According to Fr. Gerard, "He was a learned man and spoke several languages. In order to become a Catholic he had declined many offers of high preferment in his church. Already he had had a taste of prison, and when he was offered the chance of escaping, I told him he could stay at my house." 

After his escape from The Clink, Fr. John Gerard concealed William Alabaster for two or three months in a London safe house and secret Catholic chapel overseen by Anne Line and Fr. Robert Drury. During that time, Fr. Gerard led Alabaster through a guided retreat based on The Spiritual Exercises of St. Ignatius Loyola and Alabaster expressed a desire to enter the Jesuit Order.

Fr. Gerard was reportedly very surprised and asked Alabaster to explain why he wished to join the Society, "when he knew, or should know, that it meant just the contrary of all he was used to."

Alabaster's answer satisfied Fr. Gerard's concerns, and the latter arranged to smuggle the former Anglican clergyman to the Spanish Netherlands and gave him 300 florins towards his future expenses.

In a subsequent interrogation on July 22, 1600, Alabaster admitted to receiving another £30 in Brussels and to having travelled to meet Fr. Robert Persons in Rome.

In 1607 Alabaster published at Antwerp Apparatus in Revelationem Jesu Christi, in which he used his study of the Kabbalah to give a mystical interpretation to the Christian Bible. The book was placed on the Vatican's Index Librorum Prohibitorum early in 1610. He went to Rome and was imprisoned for a time by the Roman Inquisition, but succeeded in returning to England and again conformed to the Established Church of the Realm.

After returning to England, Alabaster became a doctor of divinity at Cambridge University and chaplain to King James I. After his marriage in 1618 his life now became more settled and he devoted his later years to theological studies. He had an appreciable library, and books with his inscription can be found in numerous libraries today.

Personal life
In 1618 Alabaster married Katherine Fludd, a widow, and was linked by marriage to the celebrated physician and alchemist Robert Fludd.

Death
He died in 1640 after serving as Vicar of St. Dunstan's-in-the-West, at Little Shelford, Cambridgeshire.

Works
Roxana is modelled on the tragedies of Seneca, and is a stiff and spiritless work. Fuller and Anthony à Wood bestowed exaggerated praise on it, while Samuel Johnson regarded it as the only Latin verse worthy of notice produced in England before Milton's elegies. Roxana is founded on the La Dalida (Venice, 1583) of Luigi Groto, known as Cieco di Hadria, and Hallam asserts that it is a plagiarism.

A surreptitious edition in 1632 was followed by an authorized version a plagiarii unguibus vindicata, aucta et agnita ab Aithore, Gulielmo, Alabastro. One book of an epic poem in Latin hexameters, in honour of Queen Elizabeth, is preserved in manuscript (MS) in the library of Emmanuel College, Cambridge.  This poem, Elisaeis, Apotheosis poetica, Spenser highly esteemed. "Who lives that can match that heroick song?" he says in Colin Clout's come home againe, and begs "Cynthia" to withdraw the poet from his obscurity.

Alabaster's later cabalistic writings are Commentarius de Bestia Apocalyptica (1621) and Spiraculum tubarum (1633), a mystical interpretation of the Pentateuch. These theological writings won the praise of Robert Herrick, who calls him "the triumph of the day" and the "one only glory of a million".

List of works:
Roxana – Latin drama.
Elisaeis – Latin epic on Elizabeth I.
Apparatus in Revelationem Jesu Christi (1607).
De bestia Apocalypsis (1621)
Ecce sponsus venit (1633)
Spiraculum Tubarum (1633)
Lexicon Pentaglotton, Hebraicum, Chaldaicum, Syriacum, Talmudico-Rabbinicon et Arabicum (1637)

Notes

References
 
  – Traces the lineage of the Winthrop family from 1498 forward 200 years.
 

William Alabaster, Book Owners Online.

Attribution
 Endnotes:
T. Fuller, Worthies of England (ii. 343)
J. P. Collier, Bibl. and Crit. Account of the Rarest Books in the English Language (vol. i. 1865)
Pierre Bayle, Dictionary, Historical and Critical (ed. London, 1734)
The Athenaeum (December 26, 1903), where Mr. Bertram Dobell describes a MS. in his possession containing forty-three sonnets by Alabaster.

Further reading
 

 both books Ceri Sullivan, examine Alabaster's prose and poetry respectively.

External links

Text of Alabaster's Carmina
Text of Alabaster's Conversion, 
Text of Alabaster's Intelligence Report, 1599
Text of Alabaster's Roxana, translated by Dana F. Sutton.
Text of Alabaster's Six Responses, 1598

1567 births
1640 deaths
People educated at Westminster School, London
Converts to Roman Catholicism from Anglicanism
Alumni of Trinity College, Cambridge
17th-century English poets
17th-century English male writers
17th-century English writers
English dramatists and playwrights
People from Hadleigh, Suffolk
English Roman Catholics
16th-century English poets
17th-century English Anglican priests
16th-century Roman Catholics
17th-century Roman Catholics
English religious writers
English male dramatists and playwrights
English male poets
People from Little Shelford
16th-century Latin-language writers
17th-century Latin-language writers
New Latin-language poets
Sonneteers